Karen Lykkehus (22 October 1904 – 25 October 1992) was a  Danish actress. She worked on the stage at the Det Ny Theater from 1928 to 1930 and Frederiksberg Theater. Lykkehus entered film in 1933 in De blaa drenge in which she starred alongside singer Liva Weel.

Filmography 

De blaa drenge (1933)
Panserbasse (1936)
Millionærdrengen (1936)
En lille tilfældighed (1939)
Jeg har elsket og levet (1940)
Sommerglæder (1940)
Gå med mig hjem (1941)
Søren Søndervold (1942)
Alt for karrieren (1943)
Frihed, lighed og Louise (1944)
Ditte Menneskebarn (1946)
Tre år efter (1948)
Altid ballade (1955)
Blændværk (1955)
Mig og min familie (1957)
Det lille hotel (1958)
Lyssky transport gennem Danmark (1958)
Paw (1959)
Eventyrrejsen (1960)
Eventyr på Mallorca (1961)
Den rige enke (1962)
Prinsesse for en dag (1962)
Det stod i avisen (1962)
Støv for alle pengene (1963)
Vi har det jo dejligt (1963)
En ven i bolignøden (1965)
Helle for Lykke (1969)
På'en igen Amalie (1973)
Pigen og drømmeslottet (1974)
Nøddebo Præstegård (1974)
Kun sandheden (1975)
Familien Gyldenkål (1975)
Familien Gyldenkål sprænger banken (1976)
Pas på ryggen, professor (1977)
Familien Gyldenkål vinder valget (1977)
Næste stop - Paradis (1980)
Kurt og Valde (1983)

External links
 

Danish film actresses
1904 births
1992 deaths
20th-century Danish actresses
Best Actress Bodil Award winners
20th-century Danish women singers
Burials at Holmen Cemetery